The Cincinnati Zoo Historic Structures are a collection of historically significant buildings at the Cincinnati Zoo in Cincinnati, Ohio, United States.  They were designated a National Historic Landmark on February 27, 1987.

The second oldest zoo in the United States, it opened to the public in September 1875. Significant for the antiquity and richness of its collections and for its efforts in the propagation and nurture of rare and endangered species, it was well known as the home of Martha, the last passenger pigeon.

History
Four zoo buildings were listed on the National Register in 1975 as the "Cincinnati Zoo District", although they were removed in 1999.  This district comprised the Kemper Log Cabin (built in 1804 and moved to the zoo in 1912), the Aviary, the Monkey House, and the Elephant House.  These buildings were the oldest existing structures in the Cincinnati Zoo complex at the time.  Two of the buildings were separately included in the "Cincinnati Zoo Historic Structures" designation in 1987 and named a National Historic Landmark: the Monkey House and the Elephant House.  Built of concrete and stone, the Monkey House had been constructed by 1880, along with the Aviary, although the Elephant House was built in 1902.  Space for all of these animals has been a component of the zoo since its earliest years: when it first opened in 1875, its collection comprised the menagerie of Andrew Erkenbrecker, a prominent bird collector who desired to form the country's first zoological gardens.  Besides a group of birds that he had collected, Erkenbrecker owned a group of mammals of all types, including multiple monkeys as well as an elephant that he had bought from a circus.

Elephant House

Equipped with minarets and a windowed dome, the Elephant House was built to evoke the Taj Mahal and a sense of contemporary India.  This concrete structure measures  in length and height respectively.  In building such a structure, the zoo followed the pattern of many other zoos, which constructed animal houses in the styles of the countries whence the animals came, but the Elephant House was one of the last zoo buildings in the United States constructed with such a philosophy.  Designed by architects Elzner and Anderson, it was placed atop the zoo's highest hill.  Its original cost was $50,000, and in later years the zoo has expended further money on renovations.

Reptile House
Originally built as the Monkey House, the Reptile House is a round Moorish Revival building designed by James W. McLaughlin for use as the aviary. Although it was expanded in 1922 by the construction of a veterinary hospital, the zoo arranged for an extensive remodelling to prepare it for the reptiles that were first placed within it in 1951. Zoo historians claim the Reptile House as the oldest zoo building anywhere in the United States. The original Aviary no longer stands, having been destroyed in the 1970s; a collection of gorilla exhibits occupies the site now. The Kemper Log Cabin is also gone, having been moved to Sharon Woods Village in Sharonville in January 1982.

References

External links
Elephant House and Reptile House documentation from the University of Cincinnati

Buildings and structures in Cincinnati
National Historic Landmarks in Ohio
National Register of Historic Places in Cincinnati
Zoos in Ohio